Guiry is a surname. Notable people with the surname include:

 Bill Guiry, Irish Gaelic footballer
 Michael D. Guiry (born 1949), Irish phycologist and founder of AlgaeBase
 Tom Guiry (born 1981), American actor

See also
 Guiry-en-Vexin, a commune in the Val-d'Oise department in Île-de-France in northern France